Acton Beauchamp is a village and civil parish in Herefordshire, England. Acton [Beauchamp] was a settlement in Domesday Book, in the hundred of Doddingtree, mentioned in the chapters for Worcestershire and Herefordshire.

Etymology

The name Acton Beauchamp means 'Oak-tree farm'. The 'Beauchamp' part was added later after the Beauchamp family held the manor in the 13th Century. Despite being in Herefordshire, Acton Beauchamp was in the upper division of Worcestershire Doddingtree Hundred. The parish population is scattered among farms, cottages and other housing over the hillsides, and was 229 at the 2011 Census. The village has an intermittent groundwater spring. 

The parish church, dedicated to Saint Giles, is built in Norman style, partly rebuilt in 1819. It contains an Anglo Saxon carved stone door lintel reused in the wall of the Norman church tower; the carving depicts a bird, a lion, and what is possibly a goat.

References

Links
Profile, nottingham.ac.uk. Accessed 15 September 2022.
British History Online
 
Acton Beauchamp on Vision of Britain

Villages in Herefordshire
Civil parishes in Herefordshire